Alphonso Taylor (born September 7, 1969 in Trenton, New Jersey) is a former American football defensive tackle in the National Football League. He played for the Denver Broncos during the 1993 season. He played in three games but started none.

References

1969 births
Living people
Trenton Central High School alumni
Players of American football from Trenton, New Jersey
American football defensive tackles
Temple Owls football players
Denver Broncos players